Kåre Harila (born 25 November 1935) is a Norwegian politician for the Christian Democratic Party.

During the cabinet Syse, Harila was appointed State Secretary in the Ministry of Transport and Communications. He later served as a deputy representative to the Norwegian Parliament from Finnmark during the term 1997–2001.

On the local level he had been a member of Finnmark county council from 1979 to 1983 and 1987 to 1991. He hailed from Vadsø.

References

1935 births
Living people
Christian Democratic Party (Norway) politicians
Deputy members of the Storting
Finnmark politicians
Norwegian state secretaries
People from Vadsø